Graziella  is a 2015 French drama directed by Mehdi Charef.

Plot
He was a projectionist and felt happy to participate in the creation of films. She was a nurse, and dancer in the evening ... With her profile at the Picasso she loved him, but by far not believe it. That was 20 years ago. Another life. Chance and the prison eventually gather pace clocked in A Special Day by Ettore Scola. Under the gaze of Alice, a former prostitute, they end their sentence day Joan of Arc, a large boarding school closed during the autumn holidays, and overnight in adjoining cells in prison. But hell is not the prison, "Sing Sing" as they say, but "the others". Graziella and Antoine are then prepared for the worst challenges to survive.

Cast

 Rossy de Palma as Graziella
 Denis Lavant as Antoine
 Claire Nebout as Alice
 Anne Benoît as The helpful woman
 Philippine Leroy-Beaulieu
 Bruno Lochet
 Astrid Whettnall
 Bruno Paviot
 François Négret

References

External links

2015 films
2015 drama films
French drama films
2010s French-language films
2010s French films